Todd Shipyards is the former name of Vigor Shipyards, before 2011.

Todd Shipyards may also refer to:

 Todd Shipyards (soccer team), an American soccer club based in Brooklyn, New York, US
 Todd Pacific Shipyards, Los Angeles Division, a former shipyard in San Pedro, Los Angeles, California, US